Berdorf is a commune and small town in eastern Luxembourg. It is part of the canton of Echternach, which is part of the district of Grevenmacher. Berdorf is known for the sandstone rocks surrounding it.

, the town of Berdorf, which lies in the centre of the commune, has a population of 1,853. Other towns within the commune include Bollendorf-Pont, Grundhof, and Weilerbach.

Population

References

External links

Communes in Echternach (canton)
Towns in Luxembourg